Crabtree & Evelyn is a current online-only and former brick-and-mortar retailer of body, fragrance and home care products.  Beginning with one store in Cambridge, Massachusetts, in 1971, the brand grew to an international presence, with hundreds of locations globally.

The founders sold the chain in 1996, and the brand has been resold several times since.  Most recently, Crabtree & Evelyn was acquired in October 2016, by Nan Hai Corporation of Hong Kong.

The brick-and-mortar stores became increasingly unprofitable, with numerous closings in 2009.  It was announced in November 2018 that all retail and wholesale operations were to cease to exist worldwide.

The Crabtree & Evelyn brand was relaunched in July 2019 as an online-only retailer.

In 2022 Nan Hai Corp made mass redundancies and the Crabtree and Evelyn US and UK websites ceased trading for a short while.

Founding
The company was founded in 1955 in Cambridge, Massachusetts, by Janus Films businessman Cyrus Harvey  It opened in a small Cambridge shop under the name The Soap Box.

In 1971, Harvey met designer Peter Windett in London and started a 25 year working relationship including changing the name to Crabtree & Evelyn. In 1977, the company opened a stall in the new Faneuil Hall Marketplace in Boston, and its first stand alone shop was opened by Stephen Miller in the Montgomery Mall outside of Philadelphia, Pennsylvania. Harvey invented the products, while Windett designed the packaging for products and stores. American tourists looked for the store in England, prompting the founders to open their first store on Kensington Church Street in 1980.  Over time, many more US and UK locations were added, and new stores also opened in several European countries, Canada, Hong Kong, Malaysia, Singapore, and Australia.

The company's name, conceived by Harvey and Windett was inspired by the 17th-century renaissance Englishman John Evelyn, who wrote one of the first important works on land conservation. He is also known for his writings on food, including a book on salads, in which he introduced the first salad dressing recipe made with olive oil from Europe. The Crabtree or Wild Apple symbol is native to Britain and the ancestor of all cultivated apple trees It was highly prized for its beauty, as well as its usefulness in home apothecary.

Acquisitions
In 1996, Cyrus Harvey decided to sell the company, and it was sold to Kuala Lumpur Kepong Berhad and operated by a subsidiary as CE Holdings. While funded and managed by the holding company in Kuala Lumpur, day-to-day operations—such as research and development, manufacturing, and design—continued to be based in the UK and US.

In July 2009, Crabtree & Evelyn Ltd. filed for Chapter 11 bankruptcy protection in U.S. District Court in Manhattan. Following the filing, 30 of its 126 American based stores closed. Stores in the UK were not affected by the filing.

CE Holdings was sold to the Hong Kong-based investment-holding company Khuan Choo International Limited, as of July 2012, for US$155,000,000.

The brand was acquired in October 2016, by Nan Hai Corporation of Hong Kong.

Multiple stores within the United Kingdom closed prior to 2018, including Portsmouth, Dalton Park at Murton Seaham, and the Glasgow flagship store in Princes Square shopping centre, after struggling to make profit and rising business rental costs. All UK stores were set to close by the end of 2019, with exception of a new flagship concept store in Islington, London.

In mid November 2018, it was announced that manufacturing operation in Woodstock, Connecticut, were to cease in the New Year of 2019. Late November 2018, it was announced all retail and wholesale operations were to cease to exist worldwide, with the Canada business filing for bankruptcy.  The previously announced flagship "concept" store opened in Islington, London, in early 2019, but was permanently closed by 2020.

The brand relaunched on 16 July 2019. Under its new ethos "Born Curious, Grown Wild" the products are available to purchase online only.

References

External links

Personal care brands
Retail companies established in 1968
1968 establishments in Massachusetts
Companies that filed for Chapter 11 bankruptcy in 2009
Companies that filed for Chapter 11 bankruptcy in 2018
American companies established in 1968
Online retailers of the United States